Andre Eric Szmyt (born September 26, 1998) is an American football placekicker for the Syracuse Orange.

College career
Szmyt redshirted his true freshman year in 2017. In 2018, Szmyt became the first Syracuse kicker and third freshman to win the Lou Groza Award, and was named a unanimous All-American. Szmyt also won the 2018 Vlade Award.

After a stellar freshman year, Szmyt's performance was marred by coaching changes and his holders switching. He returned to a better form when Bob Ligashesky took over as the special teams coordinator in 2022.

References

External links
Syracuse Orange bio

1998 births
Living people
All-American college football players
American football placekickers
People from Vernon Hills, Illinois
Players of American football from Illinois
Sportspeople from the Chicago metropolitan area
Syracuse Orange football players